William Stephen Jones (born 26 March 1990) is an Australian-born former English professional cricketer.  Jones played as a right-handed batsman who bowled leg break.  He was born in Perth, Western Australia.

Jones made his Minor Counties Championship debut for Hertfordshire against Cumberland in 2009.  He played five further Minor Counties Championship fixtures that season, the last coming against Northumberland.  The following season he played two MCCA Knockout Trophy matches against Dorset and Oxfordshire.

Having played for the Leicestershire Second XI, he made his full Leicestershire debut in a List A match against Surrey at The Oval in the 2011 Clydesdale Bank 40. He made his County Championship debut in the last game of the 2011 season against Middlesex at Grace Road.

Jones studied at Cardiff University, where he played for Cardiff MCCU against first-class opposition.

References

External links

1990 births
Living people
Australian emigrants to England
Australian expatriate sportspeople in England
English cricketers
Hertfordshire cricketers
Leicestershire cricketers
Alumni of Cardiff University
Cardiff MCCU cricketers
Cricketers from Perth, Western Australia
English cricketers of the 21st century